Fluprednisolone is a pregnane.  It is a corticosteroid.

References

Corticosteroids
Organofluorides